Asmundtorps IF is a Swedish football club located in Asmundtorp.

Background
Asmundtorps IF currently plays in Division 5 Skåne Nordvästra which is the seventh tier of Swedish football. They play their home matches at the Asmundtorps IP in Asmundtorp.

The club is affiliated to Skånes Fotbollförbund.

Asmundtorps IF announced in autumn 2019 via their Instagram page, the signing of English right back Craig Simkiss with a "strong pass foot".

Season to season

Footnotes

External links
 Asmundtorps IF – Official website
 Asmundtorps IF on Facebook

Sport in Skåne County
Football clubs in Skåne County